Zoliflodacin (development codes AZD0914 and ETX0914) is an experimental antibiotic that is being studied for the treatment of infection with Neisseria gonorrhoeae (gonorrhea). It has a novel mechanism of action which involves inhibition of bacterial type II topoisomerases. It is being developed by Entasis Therapeutics and is (as of 2020) in Phase III clinical trials.

References 

Experimental drugs
Antibiotics
2-Oxazolidinones
Benzisoxazoles
Fluoroarenes
Barbiturates
Tetrahydroquinolines
Morpholines
Spiro compounds